Elizabeth Margaret Priddle (born 16 November 1993) is a Scottish cricketer who currently plays for Cumbria. An all-rounder, she plays as a right-handed batter and right-arm medium bowler. She played for the Scotland women's national cricket team between 2010 and 2017, including playing in the 2017 Women's Cricket World Cup Qualifier in February 2017.

References

External links
 
 

1993 births
Living people
Cricketers from Dundee
Scottish women cricketers
Cumbria women cricketers